Algonquin or Algonquian—and the variation Algonki(a)n—may refer to:

Languages and peoples
Algonquian languages, a large subfamily of Native American languages in a wide swath of eastern North America from Canada to Virginia
Algonquin language, the language of the Algonquin people in Canada, for which the Algonquian languages group is named
Algonquian peoples, indigenous tribes of North America composed of people who speak the Algonquian languages
Algonquin people, a subgroup of Algonquian people who speak the Algonquin language and live in Quebec and Ontario, Canada

Arts and media
Algonquin (film), a 2013 Canadian film
Algonquin Books, an imprint of Workman Publishing Company
Algonquin, a fictional island, based on Manhattan, in the video game Grand Theft Auto IV
A dog from the 1988 film Elvira: Mistress of the Dark

Buildings and institutions
The Algonquin, a hotel in St. Andrews, New Brunswick
Algonquin Club, Boston, Massachusetts
Algonquin Hotel, New York City
Algonquin Round Table, a group of New York writers, critics, actors and wits who regularly congregated at the Algonquin Hotel
Algonquin Power & Utilities, a utility company operating in North America
Algonquin Radio Observatory, a radio telescope research facility in the Algonquin Provincial Park, Ontario, Canada
Algonquin Regional High School, located in Northborough, Massachusetts
Algonquin College, a college in Ontario, Canada

Military
French ship Algonquin (1753), ship built in Quebec City, New France
The Algonquin Regiment (Northern Pioneers), an infantry regiment in the Canadian Forces
HMCS Algonquin, at least two ships of the Canadian Navy
USAHS Algonquin, a 1926 hospital ship of the United States Army Transportation Service
USS Algonquin, at least three ships of the United States Navy

Places
Glacial Lake Algonquin, a North American proglacial lake at the time of the last ice age

Canada
Algonquin, Ontario, a community in the township of Augusta
Algonquin Highlands, Ontario, a township
South Algonquin, Ontario, a township
Algonquin Provincial Park, a provincial park in Ontario
Algonquin Island, one of the Toronto Islands in Ontario

United States
Algonquin, Illinois
Algonquin Township, McHenry County, Illinois
Algonquin, Louisville, Kentucky
Algonquin, Maryland
 Algonquin, Michigan
Algonkian Regional Park, Virginia
Algonquin Peak, the second highest mountain in New York state
"Algonquin", A 12,574' peak in the Indian Peaks Wilderness, Colorado
"Algonquin", also a small Northwestern community located in the city limits of Sault Ste. Marie, Michigan

See also

Algonquian language (disambiguation)
Virginia Algonquian (disambiguation)

Language and nationality disambiguation pages